Polygala alba, commonly called white milkwort, is a species of flowering plant in the milkwort family (Polygalaceae).

Distribution
It is native to North America, where it is found in Canada, Mexico, and the United States. In the United States, its range is concentrated in the Great Plains and the Southwest. Its natural habitat is in rocky or sandy dry prairies.

Description
It produces small white flowers, distributed in an elongated raceme. It flowers in late spring and early summer.

References

alba